The 1979 European Baseball Championship was held in Italy and was won by Italy for the third time in a row. The Netherlands finished as runner-up.

Standings

References
(NL) European Championship Archive at honkbalsite

European Baseball Championship
European Baseball Championship
1979
1979 in Dutch sport